Virginia Vale (born Dorothy Howe, May 20, 1920 – September 14, 2006) was an American film actress. She starred in a number of B-movie westerns but took a variety of other roles as well, notably in Blonde Comet (1941), in which she played a race car driver.

Early years
Vale was the daughter of Mr. and Mrs. H. H. Howe. Before becoming a professional actor, she was a switchboard operator in Dallas, Texas, and honed her acting skills in productions at a little theater in Dallas. After a representative of Paramount Pictures saw her in a leading role, he invited her to make a screen test, which led to a contract. (Another source says that Howe was working at the switchboard in Metro-Goldwyn-Mayer's Dallas office, where a talent scout for Paramount found her and signed her to a contract.)

Career
Dorothy Howe showed promise at Paramount, working steadily in the studio's feature films until 1939. Her best-known Paramount picture is probably The Big Broadcast of 1938, in which she played one of Bob Hope's former wives. 

The name "Virginia Vale" had been chosen in advance for the female winner of the 1939 Gateway to Hollywood radio contest, a nationwide talent search sponsored by producer Jesse Lasky—as noted (somewhat indignantly) then by another Virginia Vale a syndicated columnist covering the film industry. Dorothy Howe edged out Rhonda Fleming in the 1939 contest, and was rechristened Virginia Vale.

Contest winners Vale and Kirby Grant were signed by RKO Radio Pictures, where they were promoted as new discoveries. They made their "debuts" (although both had previously worked in pictures) in the RKO dramatic feature Three Sons. After the promotional hoopla died down, RKO had no vehicles for Vale: although her alto speaking voice and mature demeanor belied her age (19 years old), she was too young to play conventional ingenues. Instead, she was cast in inexpensive B-western features starring George O'Brien or Tim Holt. Although she also appeared in small roles in the studio's features and short subjects, she usually worked in RKO westerns. By 1941 she was established as the leading lady in RKO's Ray Whitley western shorts.

PRC, the smallest of the Hollywood studios, couldn't afford star names and relied on familiar featured players. In 1941 PRC borrowed Virginia Vale from RKO to co-star in South of Panama opposite Roger Pryor. After her RKO contract lapsed in 1942, Vale returned to PRC for two features before going on hiatus for three years. She came back to PRC in 1945 for a single feature, Crime, Inc., signaling the end of her movie career. "The last year I remained in the business, I only worked three weeks," she recalled. "I didn't know how to approach anybody about work. I just figured, 'This is not for me, so I'll say goodbye to the industry." Virginia Vale's final association with PRC was performing live at the studio for an American Legion function on September 29, 1945.

After her film career, she became an executive secretary at Lockheed and also a competition judge for the US Figure Skating Association. She was eventually honored by the USFSA for 50 years of service in that role.  Before becoming a judge, she'd also briefly been a competition skater.  Her life in film and skating was featured at the 2002 U.S. figure skating championships and a memorial trophy for "most outstanding performance" was given in her name at the 2007 California Championships.

Filmography

Bibliography 
 Boyd Magers, Michael G. Fitzgerald (1999), Westerns Women: Interviews With 50 Leading Ladies Of Movie And Television Westerns From The 1930s To The 1960s, Jefferson, N.C.: McFarland and Co., 
 Herb Fagen (1996), White Hats and Silver Spurs: Interviews With 24 Stars of Film and Television Westerns of the Thirties Through the Sixties, Jefferson, N.C.: McFarland and Co.,

References

External links 
 
 
 "History of the Los Angeles Figure Skating Club", by Virginia Vale (1982 - originally published in club newsletter).

1920 births
2006 deaths
Actresses from Dallas
Western (genre) film actresses
20th-century American actresses
American film actresses
Figure skating judges
21st-century American women